William, Count of Évreux (died 16 April 1118) was a powerful member of the Norman aristocracy during the period following the Norman conquest of England. He is one of the few documented to have been with William the Conqueror at the Battle of Hastings.

Career
William was the son of Richard, Count of Évreux, and his wife, Godchildis (Adelaide). William, referred to as Count of Évreux in early 1066, contributed 80 ships towards the planned invasion of England later that year. However, as William did not succeed his father until the year following, this seems to be the lists only anachronism "as far as Norman names are concerned." William is one of the few known companions of William the Conqueror at the Battle of Hastings in 1066. For his participation he was rewarded with a modest tenancy-in-chiefdom. However, he was probably not yet of age in 1066 which might have prevented him from taking a more profitable share in England. Another indicator of his youth in 1066 was that he fought for King Henry I at the Battle of Tinchebray in 1106, some 40 years later.

William was taken prisoner during the siege of the castle of Sainte-Suzanne in 1085. In 1090, William caused his cousin Robert Curthose more problems when he waged a private war against his neighbor in Conches, Raoul II of Tosny. As one of his early supporters Raoul sought help from Duke Robert but in return received only vague promises. Ralph then went to King William II of England who readily agreed to help; as he was looking for ways to undermine his brother the Norman duke.

As Count William became older and somewhat feeble, his wife assumed the governing of Évreux. Orderic Vitalis described her: "The Countess was distinguished for her wit and beauty; she was one of the tallest women in all Evreux, and of very high birth, being the daughter of William, the illustrious count of Nevers." But she was headstrong and bold in her political affairs, often ignoring the council of her husband's barons. After numerous complaints against her to the king, and that she had the king's donjon leveled at Évreux; this caused both William and Helvise to be exiled on two occasions.

In 1114, Countess Helvise died and was buried at Noyon. William d'Évreux was "struck down by apoplexy" on 16 April 1118, and was buried in Fontenelle Abbey, next to his father. The fact he died without children caused King Henry I of England problems as Count William's nearest relative was Amaury III of Montfort, a vassal of Louis VI of France.

Count William and his wife, Helvise, donated property to the abbey of Saint-Martin, Troarn by charter dated to [1100/14]. With council from Roger, abbot of Saint-Evroul, they founded a monastery at Noyan. In 1108 William and his wife, out of their own funds, laid out the foundation of a church devoted to St. Mary, mother of God, but with interruptions due to their exile and other troubles, they died before the project was completed.

Family
William married Helvise de Nevers, daughter of William I, Count of Nevers, and his first wife Ermengarde of Tonnerre.

Domesday landholdings
According to the Domesday Book, William d'Evreux held the following lands in 1086 as Tenant-in-chief:

Notes

References

Sources

11th-century Normans
1118 deaths
Counts of Évreux
Norman warriors
Companions of William the Conqueror
Year of birth unknown
House of Normandy